Dennis Rowland is a jazz vocalist born and raised in Detroit.

Career
Having grown up in a household of jazz enthusiasts, Rowland developed an appreciation for jazz music at an early age. At the age of five or six Rowland heard the vocals of Joe Williams of the Count Basie Orchestra, which has influenced his approach to singing ever since.

In the early 1970s, Rowland worked as a singer and actor in Detroit. In 1977 Count Basie hired him to sing on tour, filling the same role his idols Joe Williams and Jimmy Rushing had occupied. For Rowland, it was a dream come true, and he toured with Basie for the next seven years. During his time with Basie, he had the chance to share the stage with Sarah Vaughan, Ella Fitzgerald and Tony Bennett. Rowland was seen as Jimmy Baker in the film Real Gone Cat directed by Robert Sucato.

Discography

Studio albums
 Rhyme, Rhythm & Reason (Concord Jazz, 1995)
 Get Here (Concord Vista 1996)
 Now Dig This! A Vocal Celebration of Miles Davis (Concord Jazz, 1997)

Credits

References

Sources

American jazz singers
American soul musicians
African-American musicians
American rhythm and blues singers
Living people
1948 births
Concord Records artists
21st-century African-American people
20th-century African-American people